Macossa District is a district of Manica Province in western Mozambique. The principal town is Macossa. The district is located in the east of the province, and borders with Tambara District in the north, Maringué District of Sofala Province in the northeast, Gorongosa District of Sofala Province in the east, Gondola District in the south, Báruè District in the west, and with Guro District in the northwest. It has a population of 27,245 as of 2007.

Geography
The main rivers crossing the district is the Phandira River; a number of rivers are seasonal and only flow during the rainy season. The Pungwe River makes the border with Gondola District.

Demographics
As of 2005, 50% of the population of the district was younger than 15 years. 14% did speak Portuguese. The most common mothertongue is Chitwe language. 88% were analphabetic, mostly women.

Administrative divisions
The district is divided into three postos, Macossa (one locality), Nguawala (one locality), and Nhamangua (two localities).

Economy
Less than 1% of the households in the district have access to electricity.

Agriculture

In the district, there are 2,000 farms which have on average  of land. The main agricultural products are corn, cassava, cowpea, peanut, sorghum, pearl millet, sweet potato, and rice.

Transportation

References

Districts in Manica Province